Olympic Hotel may refer to:
 Fairmont Olympic Hotel (Seattle) or Olympic Hotel, a hotel in Seattle, Washington, U.S.
 Olympic Club Hotel, a hotel in Centralia, Washington, U.S.
 Olympic Hotel, Sydney, a hotel in Paddington, New South Wales.
 Olympic Hotel, Tehran, a facility at the Azadi Sport Complex
 Olympic Hotel, the setting of the British sitcom Heartburn Hotel